Pedigo is a surname. Notable people with the surname include:

Brienne Pedigo, American sports announcer
Hayden Pedigo (born 1994), American avant-garde musician, politician, performance artist, and model
Ian Pedigo (born 1973), American artist
Tom Pedigo (1940–2000), American set decorator

See also
Perigo